Yves Berger (14 January 1931 – 16 November 2004) was a French writer and editor.

From 1960 to 2000, he was the literary director of Éditions Grasset, and published several novels in which he expressed his attachment to the United States.

Biography 
The son of a road transporter, Yves Berger affirmed that this detail has its importance because several of his works were filled with his love of the voyages. His childhood, rocked by Jack London and Fenimore Cooper, inspired him with this passion for the New World that never left him.

A teacher of English, he joined Grasset in 1960, becoming one of its pillars. He earned the nickname of "manitou of literary prizes" and the reputation of making or undoing the French literary prizes. He wrote his first novel, "The South," in 1962 on the State of Virginia before the American Civil War. Yves Berger also contributes to make French authors known such as Marie-Claire Blais and Antonine Maillet and prefaced the works of Native Americans authors such as Dee Brown, Vine Deloria and N. Scott Momaday whom he considered to be the greatest Amerindian writer of today.

In 1975, as Pierre Sabbagh's cultural adviser on the 2nd channel of french television, he convinces Jacqueline Baudrier in charge of the 1st channel to replace Marc Gilbert's Italics with Bernard Pivot's Ouvrez les guillemets talk show. 

In 1996 he was appointed president of the "observatoire national de la langue française", an organism now deceased, then on 17 October 2003, vice-president of the Conseil supérieur de la langue française. He complained of the ravages of American English on the French language. In April 2004, he was elected by the Académie royale de langue et de littérature françaises de Belgique to occupy the seat of Robert Mallet, died 4 December 2002. He married in 1979, Marie-Claire Foulon.

Works

Novels 
1962: Le Sud, Prix Femina
1976: Le Fou d'Amérique
1987: Les Matins du Nouveau Monde
1990: La Pierre et la Saguaro, Prix de la langue française
1992: L'Attrapeur d'ombres, Prix Colette
1994: , Prix Médicis
1997: Le Monde après la pluie
2000: Santa Fé. The theme is that of lost youth. It is the story of the double passion of a man, Roque, in his sixties. The one he carries to Lea, who is 18 years old, and the one he devotes to the New World.

Essays 
1958: Boris Pasternak
 Que peut la littérature ?, (collective)
 Dictionnaire amoureux de l'Amérique, Plon, series "" (Prix Renaudot de l'essai in 2003)

External links 
 Yves Berger on Babelio
 Yves Berger est mort on L'Obs (18 November 2004)
 Yves Berger on Académie Royale de langue française
 Yves Berger remonte le temps on L'Express (1 March 1998)

References

1931 births
Writers from Avignon
20th-century French non-fiction writers
20th-century French male writers
Prix Médicis winners
Prix Femina winners
2004 deaths
Members of the Académie royale de langue et de littérature françaises de Belgique
Prix Renaudot de l'essai winners